The men's association football tournament at the 2015 Indian Ocean Island Games (French: Jeux des îles de l'océan Indien 2015) will be held in Réunion.

The competition format will be determined based upon the number of teams entering the competition. Each team will have up to 20 players.

If more than four teams enter there will be two Groups; A and B. Réunion, the representative team of the host will be placed in Group A and Seychelles, the winner of the 2011 edition will be placed in Group B.

Venues
Six football stadiums will host matches of the Football competition

Stade Jean-Ivoula, Saint-Denis
Stade Michel Volnay, Saint-Pierre
Stade Jean-Allane, Saint-Benoît
Stade Klébert Picard, Le Tampon
Stade Baby-Larivière, Saint-André
Stade Georges Lambrakis, Le Port

Men's tournament

Women's tournament

See also
Indian Ocean Island Games
Football at the Indian Ocean Island Games

References

External links
Official website

2015
Indian Ocean Games 2015
2015 in Réunion
2015 Indian Ocean Island Games events